R700 road may refer to:
 R700 road (Ireland)
 R700 (South Africa)